Francis Forde may refer to:

 Francis Forde (East India Company officer) (1718–1770), British officer who served with Clive of India
 Francis Forde (hurler) (born 1974), Irish hurling selector and former coach, manager and player
 Frank Forde (1890–1983), Prime Minister of Australia

See also
Francis Ford (disambiguation)